Penicillium primulinum is an anamorph species of fungus in the genus Penicillium.

References

Further reading 
 
 

primulinum
Fungi described in 1927